Solheim Church may refer to:

Solheim Church (Bergen), a church in Bergen municipality, Vestland county, Norway
Solheim Church (Masfjorden), a church in Masfjorden municipality, Vestland county, Norway